Mere may refer to:

Places
 Mere, Belgium, a village in East Flanders
 Mere, Cheshire, England
 Mere, Wiltshire, England

People 
 Mere Broughton (1938–2016), New Zealand Māori language activist and unionist
 Mere Smith, American television script-writer and story editor
 Ain-Ervin Mere (1903–1969), Estonian war criminal

Other uses 
Mere (lake), a type of body of water, often one that is broad in relation to its depth.
Mere (weapon), a Māori war club
Mere (album), an album by Norwegian rock band deLillos
Mère, honorary title given to female French cooks
Mere, a brand of Russian discount supermarket chain Svetofor

See also 
Mere Brow, Lancashire, England
Mere Green (disambiguation), two places in England
Meré, Spain
Méré (disambiguation)
Meres (disambiguation)